Tell al-Sultan (or Tall as-Sultan, Tell es-Sultan and Tell Sultan) could refer to the following locations:

 Tell Sultan, a village in northern Syria
 Tel al-Sultan, a refugee camp in the southern Gaza Strip
 Tell es-Sultan, an archaeological site near Jericho in the West Bank